The Arnold–Park Log Home is a historic house, located in Portland, Oregon, United States. It is listed on the National Register of Historic Places, and is preserved by the State of Oregon within the Tryon Creek State Natural Area.

References

Houses completed in 1907
American Craftsman architecture in Oregon
State parks of Oregon
Houses on the National Register of Historic Places in Portland, Oregon
1907 establishments in Oregon
Southwest Portland, Oregon